The Mountain West Conference Men's Basketball Player of the Year is a basketball award given to the Mountain West Conference's most outstanding player. The award was first given following the 1999–2000 season, the first year of the conference's existence. As of 2023, no player has received the award multiple times. Two winners of the conference award were consensus national players of the year: Andrew Bogut of Utah (2005) and Jimmer Fredette of BYU (2011).

Among current conference members, San Diego State has the most winners with five, with New Mexico in second place with four and Colorado State in third place with two. Other current conference members with a winner include Air Force, Boise State, Fresno State,  San Jose State, Nevada and Utah State with one each. The remaining three other current all-sports members are yet to have a winner—charter members UNLV and Wyoming. Former conference members BYU and Utah had five and four players who won the award, respectively — both schools left for other conferences in 2011.

Key

Winners

Winners by school

Footnotes

References
.

NCAA Division I men's basketball conference players of the year
Player of the Year
Awards established in 2000